CKYK-FM is a French-language Canadian radio station located in Saguenay, Quebec, but the station's official city of license is Alma.

Owned and operated by Cogeco following its 2018 acquisition of most of the stations formerly owned by RNC Media, it broadcasts on 95.7 MHz using a directional antenna with a peak effective radiated power of 100,000 watts (class C). The station airs an active rock format with some talk radio programming, branded as KYK Radio X.

The station was launched in 1993 at 95.5 FM, until it moved to its current frequency in 2000.

On April 29, 2008, the station was authorized by the CRTC to add a low-power rebroadcaster on 96.3 FM in downtown Alma.

By 2011, the station changed to a more active rock format, by adding some classic rock even though the modern rock currents remain on the station.

References

External links
 

Kyk
Kyk
Kyk
Alma, Quebec
Radio stations established in 1993
1993 establishments in Quebec
Kyk